Marco Antônio Lemos Tozzi (7 November 1973 – 27 December 2011), commonly known as Catê, was a Brazilian footballer who played for clubs of Brazil, Chile, Italy, the United States and Venezuela.

Career
Born in Cruz Alta, Rio Grande do Sul, Catê began his football career with local side Guarany. He had a brief spell with Grêmio before finding success with São Paulo under manager Telê Santana.

Catê played for Brazil at the 1993 FIFA World Youth Championship finals in Australia.

Death 
Catê died in a road traffic accident in the town of Ipê, Rio Grande do Sul, when the car he was driving was involved in a collision with a truck.

Honors

Club

Domestic
 São Paulo 1991, 1992 (Campeonato Paulista)
 Cruzeiro 1994 (Campeonato Mineiro)
 Universidad Católica 1996 (Copa Libertadores Liguilla) and 1997 (Torneo Apertura)

International
 São Paulo 1992, 1993 (Copa Libertadores and Intercontinental Cup) and 1994 (Copa Conmebol)

Individual 
 Midnight Riders Man of the Year, 2001

References

External links 
 Profile at New England Soccer Today

1973 births
2011 deaths
Sportspeople from Rio Grande do Sul
Brazilian footballers
Brazilian football managers
Brazilian expatriate footballers
Association football forwards
Grêmio Foot-Ball Porto Alegrense players
São Paulo FC players
Cruzeiro Esporte Clube players
Club Deportivo Universidad Católica footballers
U.C. Sampdoria players
CR Flamengo footballers
New England Revolution players
Clube 15 de Novembro players
Grêmio Esportivo Glória players
UA Maracaibo players
Club Deportivo Palestino footballers
Clube do Remo players
Clube Esportivo Bento Gonçalves players
Brusque Futebol Clube players
Expatriate footballers in Chile
Expatriate footballers in Italy
Expatriate soccer players in the United States
Expatriate footballers in Venezuela
Brazilian expatriate sportspeople in Chile
Brazilian expatriate sportspeople in Italy
Brazilian expatriate sportspeople in the United States
Brazilian expatriate sportspeople in Venezuela
Road incident deaths in Brazil
Major League Soccer players
Major League Soccer All-Stars
Serie B players
Brazil youth international footballers
Brazil under-20 international footballers
Brusque Futebol Clube managers